Stay Free is an album by the American R&B duo Ashford & Simpson, released in 1979. It peaked at No. 23 on the Billboard 200.

"Found a Cure" peaked at No. 1 on Billboard'''s Disco Top 100 chart.

Critical reception
Robert Christgau praised the "groove" of the songs, but noted that Stay Free didn't reach the same highs as previous albums. The Bay State Banner thought that the duo's "production adds tough, jumping instrumental accompaniment behind them, and keeps their torrid exchanges prominently in the middle of an aggressively mixed work."

AllMusic wrote that "the title track was spectacular, and the rest of the album was expertly produced, performed, and arranged." The Philadelphia Inquirer'' stated that the pair "sang about marriage, commitment and difficult relationships with frankness and a sense of romance that was untainted by sentimentality."

Track listing
All tracks composed by Nickolas Ashford and Valerie Simpson
"Found a Cure" – 7:01
"Stay Free" – 5:28
"Dance Forever" – 5:48
"Nobody Knows" – 6:34
"Crazy" – 3:40
"Finally Got to Me" – 4:41
"Follow Your Heart" – 4:46

Personnel
Nickolas Ashford and Valerie Simpson - lead vocals, backing vocals
Eric Gale, Steve Khan - guitar
Francisco Centeno, Anthony Jackson - bass
Chris Parker, Steve Gadd, Jimmy Young - drums
Ralph MacDonald - percussion, congas, Syndrums
David Carey - timpani
Ray Chew - Minimoog synthesizer, piano, Fender Rhodes electric piano
Valerie Simpson - piano
Ullanda McCullough, Chandra Armstead, Frank Floyd, Jo Armstead - backing vocals
Eddie Daniels, George Young - flute
Seldon Powell - horns
Alfred Brown - strings
John Davis, Paul Riser, Rob Mounsey - string and horn arrangements

References

Ashford & Simpson albums
1979 albums